Abdalian Cooperative Housing Society is a housing estate located within union council 120 (Ali Raza Abad) in Iqbal Tehsil of Lahore, Punjab, Pakistan.

References

Iqbal Town, Lahore